Sir John Campbell FRCS (1862 – 31 August 1929) was a senior Northern Irish consultant surgeon and politician.

He was the son of the Reverend Robert Campbell and was educated at the Royal University of Ireland and later at the Rotunda Hospital and the London Hospital. During the First World War, he served in France as the chief surgeon at No. 5 British Red Cross Hospital.

He was a member of the Northern Ireland Parliament for Queen's University of Belfast from 1921 to 1929.

He was knighted in the 1925 New Year Honours. He died after a long illness at his house at Craigavad, County Down on 31 August 1929.

References

1862 births
1929 deaths
Knights Bachelor
Irish surgeons
Ulster Unionist Party members of the House of Commons of Northern Ireland
Members of the House of Commons of Northern Ireland 1921–1925
Members of the House of Commons of Northern Ireland 1925–1929
Fellows of the Royal College of Surgeons
Members of the House of Commons of Northern Ireland for Queen's University of Belfast